Svart Records is a Finnish independent record company focused on heavy metal music, especially doom metal. It concentrates mostly on releasing LP reissues of albums previously unavailable on vinyl.

Discography

 Callisto, Providence 2LP (SVR001)
 Burning Saviours, Hundus LP (SVR002)
 Reverend Bizarre, Harbinger of Metal 2LP (SVR003)
 Steve Von Till, A Grave Is A Grim Horse LP (SVR004)
 Rippikoulu, Musta Seremonia CD/LP (SVR005)
 Last Calls, Last Calls mLP (SVR006)
 Katatonia, Dance Of December Souls 2LP (SVR007)
 Reverend Bizarre, In the Rectory of the Bizarre Reverend 2LP (SVR008)
 Hour of 13, Possession 7" (SVR009)
 Metsatöll, Äio 2LP (SVR010)
 Kalmah, 12 Gauge LP (SVR011)
 Beherit, Engram LP (SVR012)
 Kiuas, Lustdriven LP (SVR013)
 Magnus Pelander, Magnus Pelander CD/LP (SVR014)
 Sweatmaster, Turn Over 7" (SVR015)
 Xysma, First & Magical LP (SVR016)
 Legend, Legend LP (SVR017)
 Orne/Blizaro, Return of the Sorcerer/One Step Into Oblivion (SVR019)
 The Gathering, Mandylion (SVR022)
 The Gathering, Nighttime Birds (SVR023)
 Steve Von Till, If I Should Fall To The Field LP (SVR026)
 Blowback, 800 Miles LP (SVR030)
 Sarcofagus, Live in Studio 1979 (SVR031)
 Sarcofagus, Cycle of Life (SVR032)
 Jussi Lehtisalo, Rotta LP (SVR034)
 Pentagram, Be Forewarned 2LP (SVR041)
 Killing Joke, Absolute Dissent 2LP (SVR042)
 Eero Koivistoinen & UMO Jazz Orchestra, Arctic Blues 3LP (SVR049)
 Abhorrence, Completely Vulgar CD/2LP (SVR099)

See also
 List of record labels

External links
 
 

Finnish record labels
Record labels established in 2009
Alternative rock record labels
Indie rock record labels
Rock record labels
Heavy metal record labels
Hardcore record labels